Victor Noriega (born May 5, 1978) is an American jazz pianist.

Biography
Noriega was born in Vancouver on May 5, 1978. He moved from Canada to the United States with his family soon after birth, and grew up in both Portland, Oregon, and Seattle. He began his jazz piano career at age 18. He graduated from the University of Washington with a Bachelor of Music in Jazz Studies.

Since 2000, Noriega has played regularly with the Victor Noriega Trio, which additionally includes bassist Willie Blair and drummer Eric Eagle. They have recorded three albums together: Stone's Throw in 2004, Alay in 2006, and Fenceless (which also featured trumpet player Jay Thomas and alto saxophone player Mark Taylor) in 2008. Stone's Throw earned the trio a nomination for the Earshot Jazz Golden Ear Awards for Northwest Acoustic Jazz Group in 2005. Alay, which featured jazz renditions of traditional Filipino songs, won Noriega the 2006 Golden Ear Awards for both Northwest Instrumentalist of the Year and Recording of the Year.

He has played occasionally in Shanghai since 2005, performing at venues such as JZ Club.

Noriega was commissioned by the Oakland East Bay Symphony to write a symphony for orchestra as part of their "Notes from the Philippines" series. The resulting work, Generations, Directions, was premiered by the Oakland East Bay Symphony in April 2012.

Noriega's musical style has been compared to that of Dave Brubeck and Brad Mehldau.

Noriega also teaches jazz piano at Jean Lyons School of Music in Vancouver.

Discography
 Stone's Throw (Victor Noriega, 2004)
 Alay (Victor Noriega, 2006)
 Fenceless (Pony Boy, 2008)

References

External links
 Official site

1978 births
Living people
21st-century American male musicians
21st-century American pianists
American jazz pianists
American male pianists
American musicians of Filipino descent
Canadian emigrants to the United States
American male jazz musicians
Musicians from Vancouver
University of Washington College of Arts and Sciences alumni